Georgia Tzanaki (born ) is a retired Greek female volleyball player. She was part of the Greece women's national volleyball team.

She competed with the national team at the 2004 Summer Olympics in Athens, Greece.
She won the silver medal at the 2005 Mediterranean Games.
She also competed at the 2009 Mediterranean Games. On club level she played with Panellinios in 2004 and for Panathinaikos.

Clubs 
   Panellinios (1998-2004)
   Mulhouse (2004-2005)
   Panellinios (2005-2007)
  Panathinaikos (2007-2011)
  AEK (2011–13)

See also 
 Greece at the 2004 Summer Olympics

References

External links 
http://www.scoresway.com/zgorzelec?sport=volleyball&page=player&id=4243
Georgia Tzanakaki at Sports Reference
http://usatoday30.usatoday.com/sports/olympics/athens/results.aspx?rsc=VOW400A06
http://www.todor66.com/volleyball/Olympics/Women_2004.html
http://inside.volleycountry.com/board82-women-s-tournaments/board88-archive/board94-leagues/board125-season-13-14/5484-hellenic-league-2013-2014-greece/?s=ffa674d9afc336326809c76b324cac4a341ff3ae

1980 births
Living people
Greek women's volleyball players
Place of birth missing (living people)
Volleyball players at the 2004 Summer Olympics
Olympic volleyball players of Greece
Panathinaikos Women's Volleyball players
Mediterranean Games silver medalists for Greece
Mediterranean Games medalists in volleyball
Competitors at the 2005 Mediterranean Games
Competitors at the 2009 Mediterranean Games
21st-century Greek women